Joyce Howard (28 February 1922 in London – 23 November 2010 in Santa Monica, California) was an English actress, writer, and film executive.

After studying at RADA, she was spotted by film director Anthony Asquith in a play at London's Embassy Theatre. He cast the 19-year-old in Freedom Radio (1941), and starring roles in films followed, including opposite James Mason in The Night Has Eyes and They Met in the Dark, the former winning her rave reviews.

She was also active in theatre, including Romeo and Juliet at the Old Vic and in A Streetcar Named Desire. She performed in London throughout World War II, even as Nazis were bombing the city.

In 1950, after 13 films, she more or less retired from acting to raise her three children by actor Basil Sydney. Howard also began a second career as a writer. She wrote three well-received novels, Two Persons Singular (1960), A Private View (1961) and Going On (2000). She also wrote plays, including Broken Silence, which was produced by the BBC. After her divorce from Sydney, Howard married American psychoanalyst Joel Shor, and moved to California in 1964.

Although the couple eventually separated, Howard remained in California. To support her family as a single mother, she embarked on a third career as a story analyst for network television. She was promoted to executive and story editor at Paramount Pictures and Paramount TV, eventually becoming responsible for property acquisition and development.

She also continued to write for television and wrote original treatments for the miniseries The Whiteoaks and Picasso's Painted Ladies. At the request of Henry Miller's widow, Howard collated, edited and wrote the introduction to Letters by Henry Miller to Hoki Tokuda Miller (1986).

Filmography

References

External links
 
 Obituary in The Telegraph
 Obituary in The Guardian

1922 births
2010 deaths
English film actresses
English television actresses
English stage actresses
Actresses from London
British expatriates in the United States
Alumni of RADA